The Four Knights Game is a chess opening that begins with the moves:
1. e4 e5
2. Nf3 Nc6
3. Nc3 Nf6

This is the most common sequence, but the knights may  in any order to reach the same position.

The opening is fairly popular with beginners who strictly adhere to the opening principle: "Develop knights before bishops." It was one of the workhorses in the family of the Open Game, at even the highest levels, until World War I. Thereafter it fell by the wayside, along with a number of other Open Games. In this period ambitious players explored the Ruy Lopez, believing it a better attempt by White to exploit the advantage of the first move. In the 1990s, this opening saw a renaissance, and is now seen in the praxis of players from beginner to grandmaster.

The Four Knights usually leads to quiet , though there are some  variations. The Encyclopaedia of Chess Openings has three codes for the Four Knights Game:
 C49: 4.Bb5 Bb4 (Symmetrical Variation)
 C48: 4.Bb5 without 4...Bb4
 C47: 4.d4 and others

Variations

4.Bb5

White's most common move is 4.Bb5, the Spanish Variation. This variation can also be reached from the Ruy Lopez, Berlin Defence. After 4.Bb5, Black has four major alternatives.

 The first of these is 4...Bb4, the Symmetrical Variation known as the Double Spanish Variation.
 Black can play more aggressively by 4...Nd4, the Rubinstein Variation. White cannot win a pawn with 5.Nxe5, since Black regains the pawn with the advantage of the  after 5...Qe7 6.Nf3 (6.f4 Nxb5 7.Nxb5 d6) Nxb5 7.Nxb5 Qxe4+ 8.Qe2 Qxe2+ 9.Kxe2 Nd5 10.c4 a6 White most often plays 5.Ba4, when Black usually continues in gambit fashion with 5...Bc5 6.Nxe5 0-0 7.Nd3 Bb6 8.e5 Ne8 followed by ...d6. Another line, which discourages many ambitious Black players from playing the Rubinstein, is 5.Nxd4 exd4 6.e5 dxc3 7.exf6 Qxf6 (7...cxd2+ 8.Bxd2 Qxf6 9.0-0 is dangerous for Black) 8.dxc3 Qe5+. This often leads to a quick draw after 9.Qe2 Qxe2+.
 The classical move 4...Bc5 is perfectly , see the famous game Louis Paulsen–Paul Morphy from the First American Chess Congress (1857).
 In recent years, Black has tried 4...Bd6!? with varying results. That move takes the sting out of 5.Bxc6, which is met with 5...dxc6 with a good game. If White plays , Black will regroup with ...0-0, ...Re8, ...Bf8, and ...d6.

4.d4

If White plays 4.d4, the Scotch Four Knights Game arises. This leads to a more , which can also be reached from the Scotch Game, e.g. 1.e4 e5 2.Nf3 Nc6 3.d4 exd4 4.Nxd4 Nf6 5.Nc3. This variation was played in the fifth game of the 1996 Deep Blue versus Garry Kasparov match.

One reason White may choose the Four Knights (3.Nc3) move order over the Scotch (3.d4), besides fearing that after 3.d4 exd4 4.Nxd4 Black may choose 4...Bc5 or 4...Qh4, is that White may want to play the Belgrade Gambit (1.e4 e5 2.Nf3 Nc6 3.Nc3 Nf6 4.d4 exd4 5.Nd5!?). It is not possible to reach the Belgrade from the Scotch; however, the Belgrade is a distant second in popularity to 5.Nxd4.

4.Bc4

A further possibility is 4.Bc4, the Italian Four Knights Game, or Prussian Four Knights Game, popular in the 1880s, though this line is regarded as inferior according to Pinski, and an outright mistake by IM Larry D. Evans.  Black can preserve the symmetry by 4...Bc5, leading to the quiet Giuoco Pianissimo. A better move order for White that leads to this position is via the Giuoco Piano by 1.e4 e5 2.Nf3 Nc6 3.Bc4 Bc5 4.Nc3 Nf6. The line is a favourite among younger players due to its simple and easy development, but was also used successfully by Nigel Short against Antoaneta Stefanova.

The problem with playing for this position via the Four Knights Game is that after 4.Bc4, the pseudo-sacrifice of a knight with 4...Nxe4!, the centre fork trick. Then 5.Bxf7+?, though superficially attractive, relinquishes the bishop pair and central control to Black. After 5...Kxf7 6.Nxe4 d5 7.Neg5+ Kg8, Black is already threatening 8...e4, and after 8.d3 h6 9.Nh3 Bg4, Black has a very powerful position, with an unopposed light-squared bishop, a strong duo of pawns in the centre, and a safe king, while White needs to work out how to get the displaced knight on h3 into play; often it will need to be played back to g1.

Qxd5 7.Nc3 Qd8 Estrin; 6.Bb5 dxe4 7.Nxe5 Qg5! Collijn's Lärobok; 6.d4 dxc4 7.d5 Ne7 8.Nc3 c6 Cordel–Schupli, 1905) 6...dxe4 (the recently discovered 6...Nb4 is also playable) 7.Bxe4 Bd6 8.d4 Nxd4 9.Nxd4 exd4 10.Qxd4 0-0 11.Be3 (11.0-0 Bxh2+ wins) Qe7 (Tartakower–Atkins, London 1922) and now the natural 12.0-0 Be5 would be awkward for White. In the above line, more ambitious is 8...exd4 9.Nxd4 0-0!?, as in a match game between Siegbert Tarrasch and Emanuel Lasker in 1916, which led to a Black win in 23 moves.

Another try is 5.0-0!? transposing to a variation of the Boden–Kieseritzky Gambit.

4.g3
Igor Glek has favoured 4.g3, preparing development of the bishop to g2. According to Pinski, Black's main responses are 4...Bc5 and 4...d5, both of which are reckoned to equalize for Black. A Halloween Gambit style 4...Nxe4 has also been tried at the grandmaster level as in two games between Ilya Smirin and Bartłomiej Macieja.

4.Be2
Though rarely seen, this move is playable. For example, if Black plays 4...Bb4, White has the responses 5.Nd5, 5.0-0, and 5.d3, which retain equality with accurate play.

4.a3
The quiet  4.a3, the Gunsberg Variation, is a specialty of Polish grandmaster Paweł Blehm.

4.Nxe5
A dubious gambit is 4.Nxe5?!, the so-called Halloween Gambit. After 4...Nxe5 5.d4, White tries to seize the centre with his pawns and drive the black knights back to their home squares. Grandmaster Larry Kaufman says that this line is refuted by 5...Nc6 6.d5 Bb4! 7.dxc6 Nxe4 8.Qd4 Qe7, which he attributes to Jan Pinski.  According to Max Euwe's opening series volume 11, Black has a decisive advantage after 5...Ng6 6.e5 Ng8 7.Bc4 d5 8.Bxd5 c6.

See also
 Italian Game
 Ruy Lopez
 Scotch game
 Three Knights Game
 Two Knights Defense

References

Bibliography

Further reading

External links

Tim Krabbé's article on the Halloween Gambit
Unorthodox Openings Newsletter #13, Critical Lines in the Halloween Gambit by Paul Keiser

Chess openings